Torchwood is a sci-fi audio series produced by Big Finish Productions based on the British television programme of the same name. Like its TV counterpart, the dramas follow the exploits of the operatives who work for the Torchwood Institute – a fictional secret organisation that defends Earth against extraterrestrial threats.

The series premiered on 15 September 2015. James Goss acts as range producer, David Richardson as senior producer, with Nicholas Briggs and Jason Haigh-Ellery serving as executive producers.

Background
The original television programme Torchwood (2006–11), an adult-oriented spin-off of the long-running British science fiction drama Doctor Who, ran for four series before entering an indefinite hiatus due to the other commitments of creator and executive producer Russell T Davies.

In January 2015, John Barrowman, who plays series lead Captain Jack Harkness, stated that there were plans for Torchwood to return as several audio plays that could potentially lead into a fifth television series, with Davies and co-executive producer Julie Gardner in discussion of the project. Torchwood previously featured in the form of radio plays that aired on BBC Radio 4 between 2008 and 2011.

In May 2015, Big Finish Productions announced plans to produce Torchwood audio plays after receiving the license to use characters and concepts from the revived era of Doctor Who and its associated spin-offs in future audio productions. The company was previously only permitted elements from the show's original series and TV film. The project received the blessing of Davies, who had been working with Gardner and former Big Finish producer Gary Russell to bring Torchwood to Big Finish since 2013.

The series premiered on 15 September 2015. Plays making up the Monthly Range were initially grouped by series: Series 1 (1–6) and Series 2 (7–12) were released monthly up until August 2016, with a third set (13–18) released between March–August 2017, a fourth (19–24) in March–August 2018, a fifth (25–36) in March 2019–February 2020, a sixth (37–48) in April 2020–March 2021, and a seventh (49–60) in April 2021–April 2022. An eighth set of plays (61–73) began release in May 2022 and is due to conclude in April 2023, while a ninth set (74–84) is due to release between August 2023 and June 2024. Story-wise, each play centres on one or more members of Torchwood and their associates.

Additionally, specials featuring ensemble casts are also released. The first, The Torchwood Archive, was released in October 2016 to commemorate the tenth anniversary of Torchwood'''s TV debut, followed by the boxsets Outbreak (2016) and Believe (2018), while another, Torchwood One (2017–), eventually spun out into its own series. The sub-series The Story Continues, marketed as a direct continuation of the TV programme, began with the three-part release Aliens Among Us (2017–18) and its follow-up God Among Us (2018–19); a third series titled Among Us is set to release in 2023. Moreover, the boxset The Sins of Captain John and the series Torchwood Soho both premiered in 2020.

PremiseTorchwood follows the exploits of the agents who work for the fictional eponymous institute – a covert British organisation that defends Earth against supernatural and extraterrestrial threats and salvages alien technology for their own use. Like the television series, the audio dramas primarily focus on a team of operatives based at the organisation's Cardiff division, Torchwood Three, while occasionally fixating on their associates and agents from other branches of the institute. Time period-wise, each play is set at a different point in Torchwood's history, ranging from its founding in the Victorian Era to the early 21st century and beyond. Certain plays also take place during events from the TV series.

A story arc central to the series revolves around a group of aliens called the Committee, who appear to have been secretly manipulating humanity since the turn of the 20th century. Despite their existence being perceived as a conspiracy, Torchwood have made efforts to foil their schemes, only to discover that the Committee have larger plans in force.

Cast and characters

Regular cast

Notable guests
Torchwood and Doctor Who characters

Julian Lewis Jones as Alex Hopkins 
Nerys Hughes as Brenda Williams 
Sharon Morgan as Mary Cooper 
Katy Manning as Jo Jones 

Annette Badland as Margaret Blaine 
Freema Agyeman as Martha Jones 
Bryan Dick as Adam Smith 
Shaun Parkes as Zachary Cross Flane 

Other

John Sessions as George Wilson 
Russell T. Davies as Secretary 
David Warner as The Committee 
Simon Russell Beale as M LeDuc 
Arthur Darvill as Frank Layton 
Jacqueline King as God 
Sir Michael Palin as The Voice 

David Troughton as Rigsby 
Kacey Ainsworth as Jill Kerr 
Denis Lawson as Casper Beacham 
Nathaniel Curtis as Lancelyn Green 
Dan Starkey as Major Kreg
Nigel Havers as The SUV
Louise Jameson as Roberta Craven

Production
The series is produced by James Goss, with Jason Haigh-Ellery and Nicholas Briggs serving as executive producers. Scott Handcock and Blair Mowat respectively direct and compose the score on a regular basis, while others contribute infrequently, most notably Barnaby Edwards and Lisa Bowerman. Scripts were initially edited by Steve Tribe before the duty was passed to David Llewellyn and Handcock, and later David Winfield, Lauren Mooney and Goss by 2022. Likewise, all cover art was originally designed by Lee Binding before Sean Longmore took over in 2021.

Plays have been recorded in studios across the UK and the U.S., including Rancho Mirage Music, Bang Post Production, The Moat Studios, The Roundhouse Studios and Ladbroke Audio. During the COVID-19 pandemic, production was carried out remotely from cast and crew's homes. Later, when studio recording was re-permitted, cast and crew had to observe social distancing rules. 

One play is typically recorded in 1–2 days and released within six months, with post production taking place in the time between. They debut through Big Finish's website for digital download and physical purchase before becoming commercially available three months later, as with all Big Finish releases. With the exception of the story A Postcard from Mr. Colchester with a duration of 18 minutes and the Torchwood Soho series which contains 30 minute episodes, each audio drama features an approximate 60 minute runtime, including a 5–10 minute behind-the-scenes segment.

Releases
Monthly Range
2015

2016

2017

2018

2019

2020

2021

2023

2024

Specials (2016–18)
 

Torchwood One
Series 1: Before the Fall (2017)

Series 2: Machines (2018)

Series 3: Latter Days (2019) 

 Series 4: Nightmares (2022)

The Story Continues
This series is marketed as a direct continuation of the TV programme, with Aliens Among Us, God Among Us and Among Us'' serving as the fifth, sixth and seventh series, respectively.

Series 1: Aliens Among Us (2017–18)

Series 2: God Among Us (2018–19)

Series 3: Among Us (2023)

The Sins of Captain John (2020)

Torchwood Soho

Series 1: Parasite (2020)

Series 2: Ashenden (2021)

Series 3: The Unbegotten (2022)

Awards and nominations

Notes

References

Torchwood
2015 audio plays
2016 audio plays
2017 audio plays
2018 audio plays
2020 audio plays
Doctor Who spin-offs
Big Finish Productions